Passerini is a surname, and may refer to:

 Carlo Passerini, Italian entomologist
 Giovanni Passerini, Italian botanist and entomologist
 Ilario Passerini, Italian sprint canoer
 Lorenzo Passerini (born 1991), Italian conductor
 Silvio Passerini, Italian cardinal, the "Cardinal of Cortona"

See also
 Passerini's tanager
 Passerini reaction
 Carlo Gambacorti-Passerini
 Elachista passerini
 Terranova dei Passerini